Richard Watson Farrell (July 10, 1910 – March 26, 1980) was an American film editor.

Selected filmography 
 Highway Patrol (1938)
 The Tender Years (1948)
 The Green Promise (1948)
 Texas Lady (1955)
 Desire in the Dust (1960)
 Bachelor in Paradise (1961)
 The Horizontal Lieutenant (1962)
 Billy Rose's Jumbo (1962)
 The Scorpio Letters (1967)
 The Last Challenge (1967)
 Speedway (1968)
 Some Kind of a Nut (1969)
 The Delta Factor'' (1970)

References

External links 

1910 births
1980 deaths
Artists from Oklahoma
American film editors
American television editors